Catelyn Stark (née Tully), later known as Lady Stoneheart, is a fictional character in the A Song of Ice and Fire series of fantasy novels by American author George R. R. Martin, and its television adaptation Game of Thrones.  She is a prominent point of view character in the first three novels. She also appears in the fourth novel, A Feast for Crows (2005) and will return in a prominent role for the forthcoming sixth novel, The Winds of Winter.

Catelyn is portrayed by Northern Irish actress Michelle Fairley on the HBO series Game of Thrones. Fairley's portrayal has garnered critical acclaim, with many in particular praising her performance during the episode "The Rains of Castamere". Due to this popularity, many fans were disappointed she did not appear again in the series, despite the character's resurrection in the novels. Author George RR Martin confirmed he argued against the decision, which he called "the first major diversion of the show from the books", and the character being cut was ultimately made by the television showrunners David Benioff and D. B. Weiss.

Character description

Background
Catelyn was originally betrothed to Eddard's older brother Brandon Stark, the heir to Winterfell at the time.  When Brandon was sadistically executed by King Aerys II, Lord Jon Arryn, who was the guardian of Eddard and Robert Baratheon, rebelled against House Targaryen.  Soon after the rebels won the Battle of the Bells, Catelyn was married to Eddard, having never met the new groom before the wedding day, to consolidate the alliance between the Riverlands and the North. She was initially disappointed as Eddard was shorter and perceived to be less handsome than his brother Brandon, but later fell in love with him after seeing the "good sweet heart beneath his solemn face".

As Catelyn
Catelyn Stark is described as beautiful, with fair skin, long auburn hair, blue eyes, long fingers, high cheekbones and full breasts, and dressed simply in the grey color of House Stark or the blue and red of her father’s House Tully.  She is proud, strong, kind and generous, has a strong grasp of politics, and is often governed by the desire to protect her children.  Catelyn is usually in accord with her husband Eddard Stark, but resents his admission of his extramarital son Jon Snow into their household.

As Lady Stoneheart
Having decomposed in the river for several days, half of Catelyn's auburn hair had fallen out and what remained was completely grey. From clawing at her face after Robb's murder, Stoneheart also has deep, gashing flesh wounds. She is a hooded woman, and has been mistaken for Beric Dondarrion's lover. 

Stoneheart has been described as having "nothing of Catelyn's mercy or kindness". Her objective as leader of the Brotherhood without Banners is to slaughter anyone associated with the Red Wedding. This includes anyone with the Freys, Boltons, or Lannisters. She has been dubbed an "antagonist" or a "villain", especially an antagonist to Brienne. She is unable to speak properly due to her throat slashing, lending to one of her nicknames "the Silent Sister". In order to verbalize commands, she must cover the wound on her throat with her hand. She is also referred to as "The Hangwoman" or "Mother Merciless".

Storylines

Book series

A Game of Thrones

After the royal party arrives at Winterfell, Catelyn receives a letter from her sister Lysa Arryn stating that the Lannisters had killed her husband Jon Arryn, the king's 'Hand' (second-in-command). King Robert Baratheon persuades Eddard to take his place. When her son Bran is injured and goes into a coma, she sits by his bed until they are attacked by an assassin who has come to kill Bran. Catelyn is wounded in the attack, and travels to King's Landing to warn Eddard after recovering. There, her childhood companion Petyr Baelish tells her that the dagger used in the attack belongs to Tyrion Lannister. On her way back to Winterfell, she takes Tyrion to her sister at the Eyrie for trial, where Tyrion escapes execution by demanding and winning a trial by combat. After the news of Eddard's execution by order of King Joffrey reaches Catelyn, she argues for peace, but is overruled by the newly crowned King Robb and his bannermen.

A Clash of Kings

Catelyn advises against Robb's plan to send Eddard's former ward, Theon Greyjoy, to forge an alliance with Balon Greyjoy. Catelyn is sent by Robb to attempt an alliance with Renly Baratheon and his massive Reach-Stormlands host. Catelyn meets Renly at Bitterbridge and follows his host to the ancestral Baratheon seat of Storm's End, where she witnesses first the unsuccessful parley between Renly and his older brother and rival claimant Stannis, and then Renly's subsequent murder later that night by a shadow creature. Afterwards, Catelyn flees with Brienne of Tarth, one of Renly's kingsguard, to Riverrun. Upon hearing of her younger sons' supposed murder at the hands of Theon Greyjoy, Catelyn goes to confront the captive Jaime Lannister. Although the novel ends her storyline ambiguously, it is revealed at the beginning of the third novel that Catelyn set him free and asked Brienne to escort him to King's Landing in an attempt to exchange him for her daughters, who were still captives of Joffrey. This, however, causes problems for Robb and costs him an ally, House Karstark, which had held grudges against the Lannisters.

A Storm of Swords

Catelyn's brother Edmure Tully places Catelyn under house arrest at Riverrun, but Robb pardons her after he announces his wedding to Jeyne Westerling, invalidating his marriage proposal to House Frey. Lord Walder Frey agrees to forgive Robb if Edmure marries his daughter Roslin, and Catelyn travels to the Frey seat of the Twins to attend the wedding with Robb and other northern lords. However, Walder Frey and his men take revenge on Robb for his slight on their house by slaughtering the northern host, an act of treachery that became known as the "Red Wedding". In an attempt to save her son's life, Catelyn takes Aegon Frey hostage and kills him when Roose Bolton kills Robb regardless, but she still has her throat slashed by Raymund Frey.  The Freys then mutilate Robb's corpse, and throw Catelyn's stripped naked corpse into the Green Fork in mockery of House Tully's tradition of river burial.

Three days later, Catelyn's body is washed ashore downstream along with hundreds of other corpses, and a wolf pack led by Arya Stark's stray direwolf Nymeria is drawn to scavenge upon the dead.  However, Arya is skinchanging into Nymeria at the time during her sleep, recognizes her mother's body, controls Nymeria to pull it out of the river and guards it against other wolves until the outlaw band Brotherhood Without Banners passes by to repel the wolves.  Catelyn is then resurrected by Lord Beric Dondarrion, who sacrifices his life force to revive her in repayment to her husband Eddard's honoring.  However, the period of time she spent deceased has caused Catelyn's body to partly decay, disfiguring her looks; furthermore, upon her reanimation she loses most of her previous kind personality, except for her hatred of the Lannisters and the Freys.  Catelyn then assumes command of the Brotherhood, and changes their aim to terrorizing anyone related to House Frey and Lannister.  Her uncompromising brutality earns her the moniker "Lady Stoneheart".

A Feast for Crows

Lady Stoneheart has employed Tom of Sevenstreams to be her spy informant during the siege of Riverrun, where the Frey forces are commanded by Walder Frey's grandson and heir, Ryman Frey. Stoneheart's informant Tom acts as a musician, hired by Ryman himself. Tom jokes he will make a song called "Talking to the Fish" about Lord Emmon Frey's speech to the people of Riverrun. 

Inside a tent where Ryman entertains his whore, Ser Jaime Lannister notices Ryman is in possession of Robb's bronze crown. When dismissing him for disobeying orders, Jaime instructs that the crown remain behind, and Tom gives an alibi for staying behind. Off-page, Tom then returns Robb's crown to Lady Stoneheart. 

Stoneheart and the Brotherhood come across a small party led by Brienne, who informs Stoneheart that she is searching for Sansa at Jaime Lannister's request. Brienne notices Stoneheart has retrieved her son's bronze crown, and when inspecting it, Lady Stoneheart sheds a tear under her hood. 

Brienne is named a traitor by Stoneheart because she carries Oathkeeper, a Lannister sword that was forged from Ned Stark's Valyrian steel blade, Ice. Brienne swears that she is still faithful, but Stoneheart insists she must prove it by killing Jaime, whom she believes played a role in the Red Wedding. Stoneheart gives her the ultimatum: sword or noose. Brienne refuses, even when threatened with a hanging. Just before Brienne is to be hanged, she sees the young squire child Podrick Payne choking, along with Hyle Hill, and "shout[s] out a word" to intervene.

A Dance with Dragons

Stoneheart is revealed to have spared Brienne, with the word shouted by Brienne evidently being "sword". Brienne locates Jaime at a camp in Pennytree during the siege of Raventree, claiming she has found Sansa with Sandor Clegane, who are both a day's ride away. The maid of Tarth warns Jaime that if he does not come alone, Catelyn's daughter will die. Jaime agrees and leaves. Later, Jaime is reported to have disappeared for weeks, a sign he has been successfully lured into Stoneheart's trap.

The World of Ice and Fire

The book states Ryman informed the brotherhood of Jaime's dismissal of Ryman, allowing the outlaws to ambush and hang Ryman near Fairmarket. However, in Brienne's point-of-view in the fourth book, Tom states "our lady" (Stoneheart) had already gone to Fairmarket, because she "never sleeps". This suggests Lady Stoneheart killed Ryman herself, and now sources differ (as The World of Ice and Fire is also written from an in-world maester).

The Winds of Winter

In a 2018 interview with the Chinese Esquire, author George RR Martin confirmed that Lady Stoneheart will reappear and have a prominent role in the forthcoming novel. He stated: "In the sixth book, I still continue to write her. She is an important part of the entire book."

Family tree of House Tully

Television series
In January 2007 HBO secured the rights to adapt Martin's series for television. Jennifer Ehle was originally cast as Catelyn Stark and filmed her scenes in the unaired pilot until she eventually left for family reasons. Michelle Fairley was then cast in the role, which she played for three seasons. Australian actress Essie Davis, who later went on to portray Lady Crane in the sixth season, also auditioned for the role when the series was being developed.

Season 1

Catelyn's storyline is abbreviated and has minor differences in the first season. Introduced in the pilot, "Winter is Coming", Catelyn does not encourage Ned to journey south. Unlike her book counterpart, she is worrisome of the command due to the fates of his father, Rickard (Wayne Foskett) and Ned's older brother, Brandon (unseen) when they rode south on the command of the Mad King, Aerys Targaryen II (David Rintoul). She also does not seem as encouraged to promote Sansa as a suitable match to be Robert's son and heir, Joffrey Baratheon (Jack Gleeson)'s future queen consort. 

The first season also excludes Catelyn's extended family from A Game of Thrones (1996), with the exception of Lysa Arryn (Kate Dickie) and Catelyn's nephew, Robin (renamed from the novels; portrayed by Lino Facioli). Catelyn's suspicion towards the Lannisters is motivated by a shred of blonde hair found where Bran fell from the tower, indicating the Lannisters' involvement (rather than Jaime refusing to join the hunt the next day). Additionally, Catelyn confronts Jaime Lannister (Nikolaj Coster-Waldau) for throwing Bran from the tower by the end of the first season. Meanwhile, in the novels, Catelyn has gradually come to this belief over time in the first two novels, before Jaime admits it in his drunken state by the end of the second novel. 

Another difference is Catelyn's travel journeys. Her journey passing the Bloody Gate to meet Blackfish and later ascending the Gates of the Moon and meeting King Robert's bastard daughter, Mya Stone (who is also excluded from the television series) is unseen.

Season 2
In the second season, some of Catelyn's political decisions and discoveries are given to other characters. Her son Robb (Richard Madden) commands Rodrik Cassel (Ron Donachie) to go to Winterfell to serve as castellan. This is a change from the novels where Catelyn gave the order in the first book, following his injuries at the Vale, which was also removed from the television series. Catelyn's realization of Stannis' part in killing Renly is given to Brienne of Tarth (Gwendoline Christie), who is also aged up for the television series.

A major difference is Catelyn's motivation for freeing Jaime Lannister book-to-screen. This event occurs on television in the episode "A Man Without Honor". In the second novel A Clash of Kings, Robb and Catelyn are informed that Bran and Rickon died, so Catelyn frees Jaime out of motherly grief for her still-living hostage daughters.

In the television series, however, Bran and Rickon's fates are left unknown (but it is later eventually believed the boys died by "Dark Wings, Dark Words", the second episode of the third season, long after Catelyn frees Jaime). Instead, in the television series, Rickard Karstark (John Stahl) wants to kill Jaime out of revenge for his secondborn son Torrhen's death, and Catelyn sneaks Jaime out in the night to prevent a valuable hostage from dying. She reserves this information from Robb to maintain the Karstark alliance with the northern crown. As a result, Robb fulfils Edmure's role in keeping Catelyn under house arrest until the war ends. 

There is a difference in Catelyn's locale. She is at Riverrun to receive Ned's bones by silent sisters, whereas Petyr Baelish (Aiden Gillen) delivers them in the Stormlands shortly after her envoy mission to negotiate with the feuding Baratheon king-brothers, Renly and Stannis (Stephen Dillane). Similarly, she reunites with Robb while he is in the Westerlands to "accept the surrender" of the Crag, and meets his future wife, Talisa Maegyr of Volantis (Oona Chaplin), rather than discovering Robb's marriage later (to a different character in the novels).

Season 3
The episode "Dark Wings, Dark Words" shows Robb and Catelyn receive seemingly definitive proof Bran and Rickon are dead. The timeframe, long after Jaime is released in the television series, is a major difference to the motivations that lead to Robb marrying his wife and Catelyn freeing Jaime. The third season also introduces Catelyn's other family members, Edmure (portrayed by Tobias Menzies) and the Blackfish (portrayed by Clive Russell), who previously appeared in the first two novels, but were absent from the show's first two seasons.

A major difference includes Catelyn's feelings towards Jon Snow (portrayed by Kit Harington) prior to her death. In the third novel A Storm of Swords, Catelyn objects to her son King Robb's intention to legitimize Jon and name him heir. She raises a point that Robb trusting Jon is not enough, stating children or grandchildren may rise up against Robb's own children or grandchildren, and remarks the histories of the Blackfyre rebellion against the Targaryen crown. 

However, in the show, Catelyn blames her lack of maternal love for Jon on the reason for her family's tragedies and downfall. The television series reduces Catelyn's fears of Jon as pure jealousy for his mother, rather than the other more complex reasoning in the novels, an attempt to maintain future dynastic peace. 

During the television adaptation of the Red Wedding, Catelyn kills Walder (David Bradley)'s wife, Joyeuse Erenford (Kelly Long). This is a change from the novels where she kills Lord Walder Frey's dimwitted grandson Jinglebell that she mistakes for a son, on the offer of "a son for a son". After Robb dies in the television series, Catelyn goes catatonic, and the Freys seemingly had no intention to keep her alive, with one slashing her throat. Whereas in the novels, it is Catelyn's face-clawing and laughter which points towards her insanity that leads to whispers of suggesting a mercy killing before she is finally killed.

Season 4
In the fourth season opener "Two Swords", Sansa (Sophie Turner) mentions Catelyn's body was thrown in the river. This is identical to the novels, as both showcase a mockery of Tully funeral customs. 

However, the aftermath is drastically changed from book to screen. Following the fourth season finale episode, "The Children", many fans expressed disappointment that Catelyn's resurrection as Lady Stoneheart was not included. In the novels, Arya's direwolf Nymeria retrieves her corpse from the Green Fork, and runs away when humans approach. It is later revealed the Brotherhood without Banners found her corpse, and Beric Dondarrion, a six-times resurrected man, gives her the kiss of life, passing on his power to her. 

On the idea of portraying Stoneheart, Fairley joked in a 2013 interview: "I'm completely insane, so it mightn't be too much of an acting stretch!" She elaborated further on the possibility stating: 

Neither showrunners explained the absence, but director Alex Graves explained in 2014 that they were "not sure" about what to "do about it" during production of the previous third season released in 2013. Then he revealed there was no plans for the fourth season, if ever. He also admitted that he was unsure of her purpose, while admitting he had not read the novels:

Showrunners David Benioff and D. B. Weiss claimed they'd purposely left her out to avoid spoiling The Winds of Winter and to minimize character resurrections in the series, despite arguments to keep her from author George RR Martin.

Season 5
In the episode "Hardhome", the television adapted version of Arya does not choose the name Cat of the Canals, a secret tribute to her mother, when she poses as an orphan selling oysters. Instead, "Lana" is the name chosen.

Season 6
In the episode "No One", Beric Dondarrion (Richard Dormer) is re-introduced following his last appearance in the third season. Being evidently still alive, Beric's appearance negated much of the remaining fan speculation of a potential, delayed entrance for Lady Stoneheart. Actor Jóhannes Haukur Jóhannesson was also cast as Lem for the episode, an ode to one of Stoneheart's henchmen, Lem Lemoncloak from the novels, and was quickly killed off. Following demand from fans of the novels, the actor agreed to videotape the monologue from the epilogue of A Storm of Swords where he delivers the speech of Meritt Frey's execution by the command of his leader, Lady Stoneheart.

Reception
Fairley's performance has received critical acclaim. The closing scene of "Cripples, Bastards, and Broken Things" was praised by HitFix's Alan Sepinwall, highlighting Michelle Fairley's acting as Catelyn gathers allies to arrest Tyrion. Time wrote about "The Rains of Castamere": "Michelle Fairley’s fantastic performance captures the horror, with the edge of desperation, anguish, and madness of a woman who has lost her sons (she believes all of them), lost her grandchild, may have lost her daughters, and for all she knows, is witnessing the extinction of the house she belongs to."

References 

A Song of Ice and Fire characters
Literary characters introduced in 1996
Fictional murdered people
Female characters in literature
Female characters in television
Fictional characters who committed familicide
Fictional characters with disfigurements
Fictional prisoners of war
Fictional murderers
Fictional characters with death or rebirth abilities
Fictional mass murderers
Fictional lords and ladies
Fictional outlaws
Fictional revolutionaries
Fictional undead
Television characters introduced in 2011